Spartochloa is a genus of Australian plants in the grass family. The only known species is  Spartochloa scirpoidea, found only in the southern part of Western Australia.

The species was first described by Ernst Gottlieb von Steudel in 1854 as Bryzopyrum scirpoideum.

References

Panicoideae
Endemic flora of Australia
Grasses of Oceania
Monotypic Poaceae genera
Taxa named by Charles Edward Hubbard
Taxa named by Ernst Gottlieb von Steudel
Plants described in 1854